Stanisław Baczyński aka "Adam Kersten", "Bittner", "Akst" (27 July 1890 in Lwów – 27 July 1939 in Warsaw, Poland) was a Polish writer, literary critic, socialist, journalist, soldier of the Polish Legions and captain of the Polish Army. Father of Krzysztof Kamil Baczyński.

Works
 Losy romansu,
 Prawo sądu,
 Syty Praklet i głodny Prometeusz,
 Literatura w ZSRR,
 Wiszary

Awards
 Cross of Independence
 Cross of Valor - three times
 Cross of Merit
 Silesian Ribbon of Valour and Merit

1890 births
1939 deaths
Writers from Lviv
People from the Kingdom of Galicia and Lodomeria
Polish Army officers
Journalists from Lviv
Recipients of the Cross of Independence
Recipients of the Gold Cross of Merit (Poland)
Recipients of the Cross of Valour (Poland)
Burials at Powązki Military Cemetery
20th-century Ukrainian journalists